Lianne Shirley  (born 13 October 1975, in Auckland) is a badminton player from New Zealand. She competed at the 2001 World Badminton Championships in Seville, the 2005 World Badminton Championships in Anaheim and the 2006 Commonwealth Games in Melbourne. With her partner, Craig Cooper, she won the 2004 Canterbury International and the 2004 New Zealand Open in mixed doubles. 

Her best result was the reaching the last 16 of the 2001 World Badminton Championships in mixed doubles. Her highest world ranking was 21 in mixed doubles.

References
 Lianne Shirley at tournamentsoftware.com

1975 births
Living people
New Zealand female badminton players
Commonwealth Games competitors for New Zealand
Badminton players at the 2006 Commonwealth Games